Nickell Peak is an ice free peak standing at the west side of Victoria Upper Lake, 1 nautical mile (1.9 km) southeast of Sponsors Peak, in Victoria Land. Named by Advisory Committee on Antarctic Names (US-ACAN) for Gregory W. Nickell, manager of the Eklund Biological Center, and of the Thiel Earth Sciences Laboratory at McMurdo Station. He died accidentally on May 15, 1974, when a truck he was driving left the road between McMurdo Station and Scott Base.

Mountains of Victoria Land
McMurdo Dry Valleys